Jermell DeAvante Charlo (born May 19, 1990) is an American professional boxer. He is currently the undisputed light middleweight world champion, having held the WBC title since 2019 (and previously from 2016 to 2018), the WBA (Super), IBF and Ring magazine titles since 2020, and the WBO title since 2022. His identical twin brother, Jermall Charlo, is also a professional boxer and an undefeated world champion. As of May 2022, he is ranked as the world's tenth best active boxer, pound for pound, by The Ring and the TBRB. He is also ranked as the world's best active light middleweight by the TBRB, BoxRec, The Ring and ESPN.

Early life and amateur career
Jermell is younger than his identical twin Jermall by one minute. Both brothers are graduates of Alief Hastings High School in Houston, Texas. They began boxing when they started following their father, a former boxer, into the gym. Jermell graduated to the elite level on the amateur boxing scene after two years, winning a bronze medal at the 2005 Junior Olympics at age fifteen. He ended his amateur career with a record of 56 wins and 8 losses.

Professional career

Early years 
He began his professional career at the age of 17 on December 8, 2007, with a four-round decision win over Corey Sommerville. On April 19, 2008, he stopped Jesus Villareal in three rounds and after scoring an impressive first-round TKO over Dwayne Jones in June, Charlo added the names Rodrigo Villareal (TKO4) and Deon Nash (W6) to his victims list before the year was out. In 2009, he scored a shutout four-round decision over Juan Serrano on February 28,  got a decision win over Carlos Garcia over six rounds on April 4, TKO'd Federico Flores Jr. in the eighth round on June 26, defeated Vardan Gasparyan in six, and then finished up the year with a second-round knockout of unbeaten prospect Abdon Lozano.

Charlo scored a sensational one-punch knockout of Chicago's Chris Chatman in the third round. Chatman's only previous loss was a six-round decision to 2008 U.S. Olympian Demetrius Andrade in 2009, but he was no match for Charlo, who controlled his awkward opponent for most of the fight. In the third round, he landed a flush straight right hand to Chatman's chin and knocked him out at 1 minute, 22 seconds. With this win, at the age of 22, Charlo had a record of 17 wins, with no losses with 8 wins inside the distance.

On June 8, 2013, Charlo fought former light welterweight contender Demetrius Hopkins (33-2-1, 13 KOs). In a close back and forth affair were Charlo controlled the action in the early rounds with his aggression and power shots, he defeated Hopkins by unanimous decision. All three judges scored it 115-113. The crowd seemed to be displeased with the performances.

Charlo next fought in October against 34 year old Jose Angel Rodriguez (17-2-1, 2 KOs) in a scheduled 10 round fight at the BB&t Center in Sunrise, Florida. Charlo won the fight in the last round via TKO.

Rise up the ranks

Charlo vs. Rosado
In November 2013, it was reported that Charlo would step up and fight Philadelphia veteran boxer and former world title challenger Gabriel Rosado (21-7, 13 KOs) on January 25, 2014, at D.C. Armory in Washington, D.C. on Showtime. Prior to the fight, Rosado was 0-2-1 in his last three fights. He was also moving back down to light middleweight after having little success at middleweight and claimed he would be Charlo's toughest fight. Charlo passed the biggest test of his career and looked good doing so as he easily out boxed Rosado to win a lopsided 10-round unanimous decision. The judges scored the fight 100-90, 99-91 and 97-93 all in Charlo's favor. Charlo landed 50% of his punches thrown compared to Rosado's 18%. The fight averaged 472,000 viewers on Showtime.

On May 24, 2014, Charlo defeated Charlie Ota at the Bell Centre in Montreal, Quebec. Charlo was dropped in round 3 but he still won a unanimous decision after twelve rounds, with the scorecards reading 118-109 twice and 115-111.

Charlo vs. Andrade negotiations
Charlo was scheduled to fight Demetrius Andrade (21-0, 14 KOs) at Mandalay Bay Resort & Casino on December 13, 2014, for WBO light middleweight title but on November 16 was cancelled due to purse issues. Andrade was reportedly offered $250,000, but later increased to what would be a career high $300,000 purse.

Following the cancellation of the Andrade fight, Charlo fought in December 2014 against Mario Alberto Lozano on the undercard of Amir Khan vs. Devon Alexander at the MGM Grand Arena in Las Vegas. Charlo won a clear 100-90 on all three scorecards of the 10 round fight.

In January 2015, Banner Promotions who promote Andrade stated the fight was back on and likely to take place in the Spring of 2015. The following month, Star Boxing and Banner Promotions announced a deal was being worked out, however a fight did not materialise.

Charlo vs. Martirosyan 
On February 17, 2015 Showtime announced that Charlo would appear on a doubleheader at the Palms Casino Resort in Las Vegas. on March 28 against former world title challenger Vanes Martirosyan (35-1-1, 25 KOs). Other venues discussed for the bout were Illusions Theatre in San Antonio, Texas, and StubHub Center in Carson, California. The fight was contested over 10 rounds. Martirosyan weighed 153 pounds, however Charlo stood on the scales at 154.75 pounds. Because there was no title at stake, there was not a hard weight limit in place. It appeared the contract stated there was a +/- 1 lb. tolerance. This is a common case in non-title fights. Charlo won a fairly contentious unanimous decision. The scores were 97-93, 96-94, 96-94. Both fighters started the fight slow utilizing their respected jabs. Charlo landed the faster punches but they came with little damage, although they were point scoring shots. Martirosyan was the boxer coming forward more and managing to find the bigger shots. By round 4, Martirosyan began to miss most of his punches with Charlo countering well. The remainder of the fight was closely contested. In round 8, there was a timeout period following an accidental clash of heads. The ringside doctor checked Martirosyan's left eye. Martirosyan felt he won the fight.

On September 25, Premier Boxing Champions announced that Charlo would next fight former light middleweight champion Joachim Alcine (35-7-2, 21 KOs) On October 31 at the NRG Arena in Houston, Texas. Charlo won the fight after knocking Alcine out in round 6 of their scheduled 12 round bout. Charlo outboxed Alcine for 5 rounds eventually dropping him in round 6 with a right hand to the head. Alcine beat the count but looked badly hurt. Charlo followed on by landing a barrage of punches to which Alcine had no reply to causing referee Jon Schorle to stop the fight at 1 minute and 20 seconds. After the fight, Charlo called out the recently retired Floyd Mayweather. At the age of 39, this was Alcine's final professional fight as he announced his retirement.

WBC light middleweight champion

Charlo vs. Jackson
During the annual WBC Convention in Kunming, China it was announced that Charlo would fight John Jackson (20-2, 15 KOs) for the vacant WBC light middleweight title. The title became vacant following the retirement of Floyd Mayweather Jr. The fight took place on May 21, 2015, at The Cosmopolitan of Las Vegas, in Las Vegas. The card also included top light middleweight boxers Erislandy Lara, Vanes Martirosyan, Austin Trout and brother Jermall, who successfully defended his IBF title. Through the first 7 rounds, Charlo had only won one round on all three judges scorecards, badly trailing (64-69). In round 8, Charlo hit Jackson with a right hand to the head followed by two lefts as Jackson turned away to adjust his mouthpiece and failed to keep his guard up. Referee Tony Weeks immediately jumped in to protect Jackson, who was knocked into the corner turnbuckle, and signaled the knockout 51 seconds into the round.

Charlo vs. Hatley
In December 2016, at the WBC 54th Convention in Miami, Florida. It was announced that Charlo would be due to fight two mandatory fights. The first of the two defenses would be in February 2017 against Charles Hatley, ranked #2 by WBC. The second mandatory would be decided when the winner of #5 ranked Erickson Lubin vs. Jorge Cota ranked #8 on March 4 fight the winner of #3 ranked Martirosyan and another contender. Lubin knocked Cota out in round 4 of their fight moving towards becoming the youngest world champion at the age of 21.

Charlo's defence against Hatley was pushed back to April 22, 2017, on the Shawn Porter vs. Andre Berto undercard. It was confirmed before the fight that Charlo would earn $100,000 and Hatley would receive a $85,000 purse. Charlo successfully defended his WBC title for the first time when he knocked Hatley out unconscious in round 6 after a right hook to the head. Before the end, Charlo was in control landing successive power shots. Hatley was also knocked down in round 3 following a combination of shots from Charlo. In the aftermath of the fight, Charlo spoke about a potential unification fight against Jarret Hurd, who won the vacant IBF title in February 2017, the title that previously belonged to Jermell's twin brother Jermall who moved up to middleweight. The fight averaged 401,000 viewers on Showtime.

Charlo vs. Lubin
On May 11, 2017, the WBC updated their rankings, placing 21 year old undefeated American prospect Erickson Lubin (18-0, 13 KOs) at number one. He moved up following his win over Cota. The ranking made Lubin the mandatory challenger for Charlo's world title. On July 20, Boxing Scene reported the fight could take place on September 30, 2017, as part of a double header, which would include Jarrett Hurd defending his IBF title against former light middleweight champion Austin Trout on Showtime. On August 24, Ringtv announced that the fight between Charlo and Lubin would take place on October 14 at the Barclays Center in New York City. Also on the card would see Erislandy Lara defend his WBA title against Terrell Gausha, with the card being billed as a super welterweight triple-header.

In front of 7,643, Charlo won the fight via first-round knockout to retain his WBC title. The opening round was cagey, with Charlo and Lubin not throwing much and hardly getting hit. The end came in the closing stages of the round when Charlo landed a huge right hand, landing flush on Lubin, dropping him backwards onto the canvas. Lubin did manage to get up, but the fight had already been stopped by referee Harvey Dock, who halted the fight immediately after Lubin was dropped and seeing him in pain. After the fight, Charlo called out IBF champion Jarrett Hurd, "Give me another title. I want Hurd. Hurd just fought. He just won. Give me Hurd. I want Hurd." Lubin believed he could have continued, but admitted the stoppage was fair, stating "He caught me with a blind shot. I didn't see it coming. He landed it. I got up. I felt like I could keep fighting, but it happens. I wanted to entertain the crowd. He caught me with a blind shot that I didn't see." The official time of stoppage was 2 minutes, 41 seconds. A member of Lubin's camp threw a chair at Jermall Charlo after the fight ended. Charlo earned a purse of $450,000, while Lubin earned $225,000 for the fight. The fight averaged 495,000 viewers and peaked 537,000 viewers on Showtime.

Charlo vs. Trout 
At a Showtime press conference on January 24, 2018, it was announced that Charlo would make a third defence of his WBC title on June 9 on the undercard of Santa Cruz vs. Mares II at the Staples Center in Los Angeles. On April 10, it was announced that Charlo would fight former world champion Austin Trout (31-4, 17 KOs). The fight would mark Trout's third world title attempt in his last four fights. In October 2017, he suffered his first stoppage defeat to the hands of IBF champion Jarrett Hurd and prior to that, in May 2016, he lost a decision to Jermell's brother and then-IBF titleholder Jermall Charlo. Coming into this fight, Trout defeated Colombian boxer Juan De Angel via an 8 round unanimous decision in February 2018. Charlo retained his title defeating Trout in a close bout. One judge scored the bout 113-113, however the remaining two judges scored the bout 115-111 and 118-108 for Charlo, giving him the majority decision win. Charlo knocked Trout down in rounds 3 and 9. The bout, which was mostly a tactical affair, was not well received by the fans in attendance. They booed during the bout and again during the post fight interview of Charlo. The first knockdown came with a combination of punches finished with a left hook to the head. After the knockdown, Trout began to fight more defensively. A counter left hook dropped Trout a second time. After the fight, Trout said, "Take away the knockdowns, and I won the fight." Charlo  stated his frustrations, "I knew he would come in and try to survive. I could catch him with my hook." According to CompuBox, Charlo landed 106 of 421 punches (25%) and Trout landed 82 of 407 his punches (20%). For his defence, Charlo was paid $750,000 and Trout received a $250,000 paycheck. The fight averaged 532,000 and peaked at 575,000 viewers.

Charlo vs. Harrison 
In October 2018, Premier Boxing Champions announced a doubleheader for December 22, 2018, at the Barclays Center in Brooklyn, New York. The card, which would be televised by FOX, would feature Jermell Charlo defending his WBC light middleweight title against Tony Harrison (27-2, 21 KOs) and Jermall Charlo defending his WBC interim middleweight title in the main event. The twins flipped a coin to see who would close the show. Harrison was coming into the fight having won his last three bouts since his loss to Jarrett Hurd in February 2017. The official press conference took place on October 25.

Charlo lost the bout by unanimous decision for his first defeat as a professional boxer.

Charlo vs. Cota 
On June 23, 2019, Charlo fought WBC #1 at super welterweight Jorge Cota. Charlo destroyed his opponent with 2:41 left in the third round with a big right to the chin, right after Cota beat the count from a previous knockdown.

Charlo vs. Harrison II 
After his first loss Charlo activated the rematch clause. The fight would take place on 23 June 2019 at the Mandalay Bay Events Center in Paradise, Nevada. Harrison couldn't take part in the fight and he was replaced by the Mexican Jorge Cota. Charlo knocked Cota out in the 3rd round. It was announced that Harrison is fully recovered and Charlo would fight him on 21 December at Toyota Center in Ontario, California. Charlo won via eleventh-round knockout and became a two-time world light middleweight champion.

Unified light middleweight champion

Charlo vs. Rosario 

Charlo was scheduled to defend his title against the WBA (Super), IBF, and IBO light middleweight champion Jeison Rosario on September 26, 2020, in a unification bout at the Mohegan Sun Arena in Uncasville, Connecticut. Charlo knocked out Rosario in the eighth round to unify the super-welterweight division. Charlo vs. Castaño

Charlo vs Castano, Charlo vs Castano 2 
Charlo faced undefeated WBO light middleweight champion Brian Castaño on July 17, 2021, in San Antonio, Texas in a showdown for the undisputed light middleweight championship. A competitive fight between them ended in a split draw, with scores of 117-111 Charlo, 114-113 Castaño and 114-114 even. The result was controversial, with much attention being brought to judge Nelson Vazquez’s 117-111 Charlo card, which was described as "terrible" by Andre Ward In the post-fight press conference, Charlo commented "...honestly I think it was a closer fight than it seems. Somebody had it like 117-111... 117-111 was kind of a large range." On May 14, Charlo and Castano had a rematch. Like the first fight, It was competitive, But in Round 10 Charlo scored 2 knockdowns and Castano was badly hurt, forcing the referee to stop it. Charlo unified the WBO belt with his WBA, WBC and IBF light middleweight belts, becoming the 7th male 4 belt undisputed champion in history.

Charlo vs Tsyzu 
Charlo was scheduled to make the first defense of his undisputed WBA (Super), WBC, IBF, WBO and the Ring light middleweight titles against WBO #1 contender Tim Tszyu on January, 28th 2023 at the Michelob Ultra Arena, in Paradise, Nevada, U.S. however this has been postponed due to Charlo sustaining a hand injury while sparring.

Professional boxing record

See also
List of world light-middleweight boxing champions

References

External links

Jermell Charlo - Profile, News Archive & Current Rankings at Box.Live

|-

|-

|-

|-

|-

1990 births
Living people
American male boxers
African-American boxers
21st-century African-American sportspeople
Boxers from Louisiana
People from Lafayette, Louisiana
Boxers from Texas
People from Houston
American twins
Twin sportspeople
World light-middleweight boxing champions
World Boxing Council champions
World Boxing Association champions
International Boxing Federation champions
World Boxing Organization champions
The Ring (magazine) champions